Kapurthala House is the former residence of the Maharaja of Kapurthala in Delhi. It is located close to Connaught Place.

It is used by the state government of Punjab and is the residence of the Chief Minister whenever he visits the national capital.

Royal residences in Delhi
Kapurthala
Government of Punjab, India